was a town located in Amakusa District, Kumamoto Prefecture, Japan.

As of 2003, the town had an estimated population of 8,711 and a density of 170.14 persons per km². The total area was 51.20 km².

On March 31, 2004, Matsushima, along with the towns of Himedo, Ōyano and Ryūgatake (all from Amakusa District), was merged to create the city of Kami-Amakusa and no longer exists as an independent municipality.

External links
 Official website of Kami-Amakusa 

Dissolved municipalities of Kumamoto Prefecture